Leslie Alexander Montgomery (5 October 1873 - 13 August 1961), better known by his pen name Lynn Doyle, was an Irish humorist and playwright.

Montgomery was born in Downpatrick, Co Down. He wrote about his early rural life in An Ulster Childhood (1921). He was sent away to boarding school in Dundalk, Co Louth. He left school at 16 to work at the Northern Banking Company in Belfast and transferred as manager to Skerries, Co Dublin where he worked for 28 years.

Montgomery took his pen name ‘Lynn C. Doyle’ from a bottle of linseed oil he saw in a grocer's shop. His first volume of stories, Ballygullion,  a humorous caricature of Ulster life set in a fictional town, was published in 1908. This proved popular and ran into several volumes.

Montgomery was also a playwright. His comedy, Love and Land was produced in London and other plays were performed by the Ulster Literary Theatre.

References

1873 births
1961 deaths
Irish humorists
Irish male dramatists and playwrights
20th-century Irish dramatists and playwrights
20th-century Irish male writers
20th-century pseudonymous writers